Sergei Borisovich Prokhanov  (born December 29, 1952, Moscow) is a Soviet and Russian theater and film actor, theater director, artistic director of  . People's Artist of the Russian Federation (2005). The most famous for him was the role  Kesha Chetvergov in the Vladimir Grammatikov's comedy    Mustached Nanny (1977).

Selected filmography
 Oh, That Nastya! as pioneer leader (1971)
  as Nikita (TV, 1975)
 Mustached Nanny as Kesha (1977)
 The Luncheon on the Grass (1979) as  Ivan Nikolayevich Kovalev
 Lenin in Paris as messenger (1981)
 Three Times About Love as Vasiliy Fedorovich Lobanov (1981)
 Investigation Held by ZnaToKi: Midday Thief as Ivan Agafonov (1985)
Genius  as  Kostik (1991)

References

External links

  Усатый нянь NEXT
 О Сергее Проханове на сайте Люди. Ру

1952 births
Living people
Male actors from Moscow
Soviet male actors
Russian male actors
People's Artists of Russia
Russian theatre directors